David Cain may refer to:

David Cain (professor) (1941–2021), professor of religion
David Cain (Texas politician), former State Senator of the 2nd District of Texas, see Florence Shapiro
David Cain (composer) (died 2019), musical technician
David Cain (comics), a comic book character

See also
David Cane (disambiguation)
David Kane (disambiguation)